Yponomeuta meridionalis is a moth of the family Yponomeutidae. It is found in Tajikistan and is also recorded from the Levant.

Larvae have been recorded on Crataegus korolkowii, Crataegus songarica and Crataegus turkestanica.

External links
 New Records Of Yponomeutoid Moths (Lepidoptera, Yponomeutidae, Plutellidae) From Israel

Yponomeutidae
Moths of the Middle East
Moths described in 1972